The Tami River rainbowfish (Glossolepis pseudoincisus)  is a species of rainbowfish in the subfamily Melanotaeniinae. It is found in West Papua in Indonesia. This species can reach a length of  SL.

References

Glossolepis
Freshwater fish of Western New Guinea
Taxa named by Gerald R. Allen
Taxa named by Norbert J. Cross
Fish described in 1980
Taxonomy articles created by Polbot